Q Steven Marsden, known mononymously as Q, is an American singer and record producer from Broward County, Florida.

Early and personal life 
His father Steven Marsden, gave him the first name Q wanting to give his son a unique name believing that he was destined for greatness. During his childhood, Marsden sang in a church choir and visited his father at a recording studio.

Career 
In August 2019, he released a self-produced 7-track R&B album titled Forest Green which contained elements from soul and acoustic pop. In June 2021, he released the "Director's Cut" edition of his The Shave Experiment album which included five new tracks.

References

External links
 

21st-century American singers
American male singers
Rhythm and blues musicians
Columbia Records artists
Living people
Musicians from Florida
Year of birth missing (living people)